Stoke-on-Trent power station supplied electricity to the county borough and later city of Stoke-on-Trent, England and the surrounding area from 1913 to the 1960s. The power station was initially owned and operated by Stoke-on-Trent Corporation, then by the North West Midlands Joint Electricity Authority prior to the nationalisation of the British electricity supply industry in 1948. The power station operated in conjunction with power stations at Burslem, Hanley and Longport.

History
Electricity was first made available in the Potteries area from a power station at Hanley. This was owned by Hanley Corporation and first generated electricity on 26 July 1894. The station had a generating capacity of 624 kW and in 1898 supplied 255,383 kWh to 30 customers, plus 96,379 kWh for public lamps. A generating station at Longton was commissioned in September 1901 and another at Burslem in 1905.

The ‘six towns’ were federated to form the county borough of Stoke-on-Trent in April 1910.  Electricity supplies were brought under common management in 1910 and construction of a large a new power station on the River Trent was started. Stoke-on-Trent power station was commissioned in April 1913. Further electricity generating plant was added to the station from 1919 to 1929.

Equipment specification

Plant in 1923
In 1923 the generating stations and their plant comprised:

The following types of electric current were available to consumers:

 Single phase, alternating current (AC) at 400, 200 and 100 Volts
 3-phase, 50 Hz AC at 415 and 240 Volts
 Direct current (DC) 440 and 220 Volts
 DC 460 and 230 Volts
 DC 480 and 240 Volts

Plant in 1955
By 1955 the plant at Stoke-on-Trent power station comprised:

 Boilers:
 2 × Babcock & Wilcox boilers with chain grate stokers
 2 × Thompson boilers with underfeed travelling grates
 4 × Stirling boilers with underfeed travelling grates

The boilers had a total evaporative capacity of 360,000 lb/h (45.36 kg/s), and operated at 275 psi and 660°F (19.0 bar at 349°C), steam was supplied to:

 Turbo-alternators:
 2 × Metropolitan-Vickers 3.0 MW turbo-alternator, generating at 6.6 kV
 2 × Metropolitan-Vickers 12.0 MW turbo-alternator, generating at 6.6 kV

The total installed generating capacity was 31 MW

Condenser cooling water was cooled in seven Davenport wood cooling towers with a capacity of 1.783 million gallons per hour (8,106 m3/h).

Operations

Operating data 1921–23
The operating data for Stoke-on-Trent power station in the period 1921–23 was:

Under the terms of the Electricity (Supply) Act 1926 (16 & 17 Geo. 5 c. 51) the Central Electricity Board (CEB) was established in 1926. The CEB identified high efficiency ‘selected’ power stations that would supply electricity most effectively; Stoke-on-Trent was designated a selected station. The CEB also constructed the National Grid (1927–33) to connect power stations within a region. Stoke-on-Trent power station was operated under the direction of the CEB from 1934. The North West Midlands Joint Electricity Authority (JEA) assumed ownership of the Stoke and Stafford undertakings in 1928. The JEA generated electricity which was purchased by the Stoke-on-Trent and Stafford corporations and sold to industrial, commercial and domestic consumers. Operating data in the mid-1930s was:

Despite the growth of electricity consumption in the mid-1930s, there were still black spots where the availability of electricity was limited. In the city centre slums and outlying working class suburbs of towns such as Stoke-on-Trent more than a quarter of the streets had no electricity service available.

Operating data 1946
Stoke-on-Trent power station operating data for 1946 was:

The British electricity supply industry was nationalised in 1948 under the provisions of the Electricity Act 1947 (10 & 11 Geo. 6 c. 54). The Stoke-on-Trent undertaking and the Joint Electricity Authority were abolished, ownership of Stoke-on-Trent power station was vested in the British Electricity Authority, and subsequently the Central Electricity Authority and the Central Electricity Generating Board (CEGB). At the same time the electricity distribution and sales responsibilities of the Stoke-on-Trent electricity undertaking were transferred to the Midlands Electricity Board (MEB).

Following nationalisation the Stoke-on-Trent area became a district electricity supply area; for commercial operation the area was split into three districts: Stoke central, Stoke north and Stoke south. The amount of electricity sold and number of customers was:

Operating data 1954–63
Operating data for the period 1954–63 was:

Closure
Stoke-on-Trent power station was decommissioned after 1964. The power station was demolished and the site was redeveloped as housing.

See also
 Timeline of the UK electricity supply industry
 List of power stations in England

References

Coal-fired power stations in England
Demolished power stations in the United Kingdom
Former power stations in England
Buildings and structures in Stoke-on-Trent